Haloacetic acids are carboxylic acids in which a halogen atom takes the place of a hydrogen atom in acetic acid.  Thus, in a monohaloacetic acid, a single halogen would replace a hydrogen atom.  For example, chloroacetic acid would have the structural formula CH2ClCO2H.  In the same manner, in dichloroacetic acid two chlorine atoms would take the place of two hydrogen atoms (CHCl2CO2H). The inductive effect caused by the electronegative halogens often result in the higher acidity of these compounds by stabilising the negative charge of the conjugate base.

Contaminants in drinking water
Haloacetic acids (HAAs) are a common undesirable by-product of drinking water chlorination. Exposure to such disinfection by-products in drinking water, at high levels over many years, has been associated with a number of health outcomes by epidemiological studies.

In water, HAAs are stable, with the five most common being:
 monochloroacetic acid (MCA) ClCH2COOH
 dichloroacetic acid (DCA) Cl2CHCOOH
 trichloroacetic acid (TCA) Cl3CCOOH
 monobromoacetic acid (MBA) BrCH2COOH
 dibromoacetic acid (DBA) Br2CHCOOH

Collectively, these are referred to as the HAA5.

HAAs can be formed by chlorination, ozonation or chloramination of water with formation promoted by slightly acidic water, high organic matter content and elevated temperature. Chlorine from the water disinfection process can react with organic matter and small amounts of bromide present in water to produce various HAAs.

A study published in August 2006 found that total levels of HAAs in drinking water were not affected by storage or boiling, but that filtration was effective in decreasing levels.

See also
Trichloroacetic acid
Trifluoroacetic acid

References

Further reading 
 ANSI
 National Institute of Health

External links
Haloacetic Acids (For Private Water and Health Regulated Public Water Supplies)
"Drinking Water Contaminants – Standards and Regulations". US Environmental Protection Agency.

Carboxylic acids
Organohalides